FCM Dinamo Onești was a Romanian professional football club from Onești, Bacău County, Romania, founded in 1994 and dissolved in 2015.

History
It all started in 1988. Mecon Onești, a team that has just been established, promoted in Divizia C. With a new stadium, Mecon hopes to have something to say in Romanian football. Promoted with Steluș Roșca, Mecon calls his coach Gheorghe Zaharia. Beyond the batch, the leadership, an enthusiastic one, dreamed at great moments for Mecon.

In 1994 AS Electromecon Onești merge with CSM Borzești. This merger took place at the initiative of Nicolae Puiu, the president of AS Electromecon with the support of Simion Albu - manager at that time of RAFO - and of Ion Marian - the leader of the "RAFINORUL" syndicate.

In 1994-1995 season he took second place in the Divizia C Seria I after Foresta Fălticeni, but promoted in Divizia B defeating in a play-off game held in Săcele (Brașov County) with a score of 1-0 through the golden goal on Flacăra Moreni.

For three years, FC Onești has worked in Divizia B occupying every time, at the end of the championship, a place in the first half of the standings. In the last of these three years, in the summer of 1998, FC Onești promoted to Divizia A (for the first time). As a result of the second place at the end of the competition (after a fierce fight with Astra Ploiești, the winner of the series) for promotion, FC Onești defeated at Făgăraș in a play-off game Electroputere Craiova with 2-1 through the golden goal, the coach of the team being Professor Toader Șteț.

At the end of his first Divizia A championship, FC Onești took 14th place out of 18 participants. 
The following year, FC Onești took the 16th place, a relegated position at the end of the championship.

The club was dissolved in the middle of the 2003–04 Divizia B season, after its main sponsor, RAFO, withdrew its support.
The club was refounded in 2009 under the name of FCM Onești.
In the summer of 2012, the club was renamed once again, as FCM Dinamo Onești.
For three years the club played in Liga IV.
The club was dissolved once again, in 2015.

Chronology of names

Honours
Liga I
Best finish 14th 1998–99
Liga II
Runners-up (1): 1997–98
Liga III
Runners-up (1):1994–95

Notable players

  Valeriu Răchită
  Ionel Pârvu
  Vasile Jercălău
  Alin Artimon
  Adrian Blid
 Daniel Scânteie
 Ionel Iriza
 Giani Gorga
 Dănuț Oprea
 Costel Bîrsan
 Marius Bilașco
 Altin Masati

Notable managers
  Petre Grigoraș
  Alexandru Moldovan
  Toader Șteț

References

Association football clubs established in 1994
Association football clubs disestablished in 2015
Defunct football clubs in Romania
Football clubs in Bacău County
Liga I clubs
Liga II clubs
Liga III clubs
Liga IV clubs
1994 establishments in Romania
2015 disestablishments in Romania